Fiona Stephens (born 1986) is a camogie player and student. She won a Soaring Star award in 2009 and won a 2009 All Ireland junior camogie medal. A two-time Purcell Cup medal-winner with Athlone IT, Fiona received sports scholarships for the 2006-'07 and 2007-'08 academic years. Freshers player of the year in 2006-'07, she holds six county and three Leinster championships with her club. Has made the transition from corner-forward, where she played in last year's All-Ireland final, to corner-back.

References

External links 
 Official Camogie Website
 Offaly Camogie website
 Review of 2009 championship in On The Ball Official Camogie Magazine
 
 Report of Offaly v Waterford 2009 All Ireland junior final in Irish Times  Independent, Examiner and Offaly Express.
 Video highlights of 2009 championship  and 

1986 births
Living people
Offaly camogie players